The filament cusk (Homostolus acer) is a species of cusk-eel found in the western Pacific Ocean from the waters off of Japan to Australia and New Caledonia where it occurs at depths of from .  This species grows to a length of  SL and is of minor importance to commercial fisheries.  It is the only known member of its genus.

References

Ophidiidae
Monotypic fish genera
Fish described in 1913